Nocturne: The Piano Album is a studio album by Greek musician and composer Vangelis, released on 25 January 2019 on Decca Records. It is a solo piano album of 11 new tracks plus arrangements of various songs from his solo career.

Background
As the title suggests, Vangelis was inspired to record music of a night time theme. Music from the album was made available by people taking photographs of the moon and submitting them to the album's dedicated website.

"Nocturnal Promenade" is the album's first single.

Track listing
All tracks written and arranged by Vangelis.

Note: The track "Longing" is not based on the song of the same name from the Blade Runner Trilogy: 25th Anniversary set.

Personnel
Credits adapted from the CD liner notes.

Music
 Vangelis – piano, keyboards
 Irina Valentinova-Karpouchina – guest piano on "Movement 9, Mythodea"

Production
 Vangelis – production
 Phillipe Colonna – engineer
 Giorgios Dermentzis – photography
 Jack Crossing – art direction, design

Charts

References

2019 albums
Vangelis albums